Stupinigi, with some 200 inhabitants, is today a hamlet of the comune of Nichelino, in the Metropolitan City of Turin (Piedmont, north-west Italy). It borders with the comuni (municipalities) of Candiolo and Orbassano on the southwestern outskirts of Turin, about 10 km from the centre of the city. Before 1869, it formed part of the comune of Vinovo.

Stupinigi is known for the eighteenth-century Palazzina di Stupinigi, one of the historical Residences of the Royal House of Savoy, for the medieval Castelvecchio di Stupinigi, and for the associated park and nature reserve, the Parco Naturale di Stupinigi.

History and landmarks
Historically Stupinigi centres on the Castelvecchio: a medieval castle which belonged to the Savoia Acaja, a branch of the House of Savoy who until 1416 were Signori of Piedmont—a much smaller territory than the present-day region—and briefly Princes of Achaia. In 1439, the castle was purchased by the Marquis Orlando Pallavicino (“il Magnifico”); in 1563 it passed to the Duke of Savoy, Emanuele Filiberto, when the capital of the Duchy was transferred from Chambéry to Turin.  Subsequently, Emanuele Filiberto granted Stupinigi to the Order of Saints Maurice and Lazarus.

The Palazzina di caccia di Stupinigi, a hunting lodge built on the grand scale, was designed by the architect Filippo Juvarra for Vittorio Amedeo II in the latter's role as Grand Master General of the order.  Work started on the building in 1729 and two years later it was ready to play host to its first hunt. In 1832 ownership of the Palazzina passed to the royal family, in 1919 it became a property of the state and in 1925 it was returned to the Order, which retains it to this day.

The park, today the Parco Naturale di Stupinigi, which covers an area of woods and agricultural land in Stupinigi Candiolo and Orbassano, was declared a nature reserve in 1991. There have been no deer here since the nineteenth century, but it provides a sanctuary for rare plant species and for wildlife.

Frazioni of the Province of Turin
Cities and towns in Piedmont